Protesilaus leucosilaus  is a species of butterfly found in the Neotropical realm only in Amazonas, Brazil.

Taxonomy
May be a subspecies of Protesilaus molops.

References

External links
 Butterflies of the Americas Images of holotype

Papilionidae
Fauna of Brazil
Papilionidae of South America